Nattawat Jirochtikul (born 18 October 2004), known by his nickname Fourth, is a Thai actor under GMMTV. He began his career when he joined in the network's reality contest "Thailand School Star 2019" and won, he then signed an exclusive contract with GMMTV. He made his acting debut when he played Glakao in the Thai adaptation of Boys Over Flowers, F4 Thailand: Boys Over Flowers back in 2021. Fourth also gained popularity when he played Gun, one of the lead roles in the 2022 Thai comedy series, My School President.

Early life and education 
Nattawat was born in the city of Bangkok in Thailand on October 18, 2004, He was nicknamed Fourth as he was born on King Rama IV's 200th birthday. He studied secondary school at Saint Gabriel's College. He graduated from the school by taking the grade twelve equivalency test.

Career 
At the age of fifteen, Fourth joined GMMTV's reality contest, "Thailand School Star" back in 2019. Him together with another contestant, Earn Preeyaphat Lorsuwansiri, were chosen as the winners, they then signed an exclusive contract with GMMTV. In 2021, Jirochtikul made his television debut when he played the role of Glakao Jundee, the younger brother of Gorya played by Tontawan Tantivejakul in the Thai adaptation of Boys Over Flowers, F4 Thailand: Boys Over Flowers. On December 2, 2022, the BL series My School President was released, in where he played Gun, the love interest of Tinn played by Gemini Norawit Titicharoenrak. Fourth also have supporting roles in the Midnight Series where he will play Li Ming, Jim's (Earth Pirapat) nephew.

During GMMTV's recent event "GMMTV 2023: Diversely Yours", it was announced that Fourth will have a main role in the anthology Our Skyy 2. He will also have a supporting role in 23.5 degrees, a GL series played by Love Pattranite and Milk Pansa.

Works

Filmography

Television

References

External links 
 
 Fourth Nattawat on Instagram

Nattawat Jirochtikul
Nattawat Jirochtikul
Nattawat Jirochtikul
2004 births
Living people